Luhansk International Airport was an airport in Luhansk, Ukraine . The airport was located 20 km (12 miles) south of the city center, 9 km to the city limit. Since 11 June 2014, the airport has been officially closed. It was mostly destroyed during the War in Donbas.

History
The history of Luhansk Airport begins in 1946, when in order to improve service in the regions, the Ukrainian SSR began work on the 285th aviation division at the site. 

Luhansk Airport opened in 1964, With its construction acelerated by the involvement of multiple organizations in the Luhansk region. 

In 1974 the airport established the 99th flying division including 6 AN-24 planes, and since 1989, 2 TU–154–B2 planes. By the 1980s there were 100 daily departures, going to almost 70 cities of the Soviet Union, transporting at least 1200 passengers. 

Following the collapse of the Soviet Union, in 2005-2006, the airport and runway were reconstructed, allowing it to take AN-124 aircraft, Airbus A320’s, and Boeing 737’s. By 2013, there were regular scheduled flights to Kyiv, Moscow, and even charter flights to Turkey and Greece.

Airlines and destinations
From December 2009 to its closure in 2014, Luhansk International Airport was a base airport of the Ukrainian airline UTair-Ukraine.

Other airlines such as Ukraine International Airlines and Motor Sich Airlines also operated into Luhansk airport.

Defunct Ukrainian Airline Lugansk Airlines was based out of the airport. But had declared bankruptcy in 2010.

Tavrey Airlines had operated into Luhansk Airport but declared bankruptcy in 2008.

Closure and destruction
Due to the pro-Russian unrest in Ukraine, airports in the Donbas region were closed, including: Mariupol, Donetsk, and Luhansk. As of April of 2014, Ukrainian forces were stationed there as part of the Anti-Terrorist Operation against the Luhansk People’s Republic. A fierce battle for the airport started on June 8, 2014, when Ukrainian forces were blockaded at the site by LPR forces. On June 11, the airport was officially closed. The Ukrainian Military attempted to create an air bridge to supply the besieged forces using 3 Il-76’s from the 25th Transport Aviation Brigade, in which one Ilyushin Il-76 (Registration: 76777) was shot down on June 14, 2014, resulting in the deaths of 49 Ukrainians.

On the night of September 1, the last remaining Ukrainian soldiers left the ruined airport, after 146 days of defending. On September 4th, the airport finally fell to the separatists. The airport terminal had been completely demolished by 2015, and eventually in 2019, a road was built over the ruble, where a museum of Luhansk People's Republic military equipment now sits on the runway.

Statistics

Accidents and incidents

 On 14 June 2014, a Ukrainian Air Force Ilyushin Il-76 aircraft was shot down on approach to Luhansk, killing all on board (9 Crew and 40 Paratroopers). This was the most severe loss suffered by the Ukrainian military since the start of the pro-Russian conflict in February 2014.

See also
 Donetsk International Airport
 Lugansk Airlines
 List of airports in Ukraine
 List of the busiest airports in the former USSR

References

External links

1964 establishments in Ukraine
2014 disestablishments in Ukraine
Defunct airports in Ukraine
International Airport
Ruins in Ukraine